Kamau Kenyatta (born June 27, 1955) is a Grammy-Award winning American musician, record producer, arranger, film composer and jazz educator.  He is a lecturer of music at the University of California, San Diego (UCSD).  He was given the Barbara J. and Paul D. Saltman Distinguished Teaching Award at UCSD in May 2009.

Life and career 
Kenyatta was born in Detroit, Michigan.  In 2013, he served as associate producer and arranger for Gregory Porter's Blue Note Records debut album, Liquid Spirit.  In February 2014, the recording won a Grammy Award in the Best Jazz Vocal Album category.  As a long-time collaborator with Gregory Porter, he also produced the album Water, which was nominated for a Best Jazz Vocal Album Grammy.  In 2016, further releases of his productions included Gregory Porter's Take Me to the Alley, Ed Motta's Perpetual Gateways, and Steph Johnson's Music Is Art.  In February 2017, Kenyatta won a Grammy for his co-production of Take Me to the Alley in the Best Jazz Vocal Album category.

As a film composer, Kenyatta worked with Hubert Laws creating the score for Small Steps, Big Strides, a Fox network documentary detailing the history of African-American film.  Kenyatta also composed the soundtrack for The Dawn at My Back, an interactive memoir that won the Online Film Festival Jury Award for Short Filmmaking New Forms at the 2004 Sundance Film Festival.  In 2015, Kenyatta scored the film Spirits of Rebellion, by director Zeinabu Irene Davis.  After the international success of Liquid Spirit in 2016, he scored the Gregory Porter biopic, Don't Forget Your Music.  The film was released in the UK in the fall of 2016. Kenyatta was given the opportunity to release the music under his own name.

As an educator, Kenyatta has worked from 1999 to the present at the University of California, San Diego (UCSD).

Discography 
 Destiny (2007)
 The Elegant Sadness (2019)

Awards and nominations

References

External links

Kamau Kenyatta Interview NAMM Oral History Library (2018)

1955 births
Living people
African-American record producers
American music arrangers
American rhythm and blues musicians
Grammy Award winners
Record producers from Michigan
Songwriters from Michigan
University of California, San Diego faculty
Musicians from Detroit
21st-century African-American people
20th-century African-American people